Pkaïla, also called bkaïla, bkeila, or pkela, is a Tunisian Jewish dish or condiment. It is one of the local variants of hamin, made from beans and spinach, as the name suggests. Pkaïla is often prepared for the holidays, accompanied by couscous or eaten alone.

See also

Ros bratel

References

Sephardi Jewish cuisine
Israeli cuisine
Spinach dishes
Jews and Judaism in Tunisia
Legume dishes
Condiments